McEachran may refer to:
Dave McEachran (1903–1983), Scottish footballer
Duncan McNab McEachran (1841–1924), Canadian veterinarian and academic
Very Rev Duncan Stewart McEachran (1826-1913) Moderator of the General Assembly of the Presbyterian Church of Victoria
Grant McEachran, English footballer
Josh McEachran (born 1993), English footballer, currently playing for Brentford F.C.